Kaizou Choujin Schbibinman Zero  is a 1997 game for the Satellaview addon for the Super Famicom. It is a side-scrolling beat-'em-up developed by Masaya and published by NCS. It is the fourth and final game in Kaizō Chōjin Schbibinman series, and the first on the SFC. The previous entries in the series were for the PC-Engine.

Plot 
The game is not a direct sequel to previous Schbibinman games, and instead features two new protagonists: Raita and Azuki.

Gameplay 
It is a side scrolling action game, where the player can make use of both fighting techniques and beam attacks. Players take control of either Raita or Azuki. Raita fights like a boxer, using physical attacks, and Azuki, fights with a sword and together they can use combo attacks. It features two player co-operative play.

Release 
It was originally intended for a 1994 Super Famicom release, before being released on the Satellaview in 1997. Thus the game never got a physical release, making the game very rare and hard to find for collectors.

In 2014, the company Extreme gained the copyright for the game from Nippon Computer Systems.

To commemorate the 20th anniversary of the game's release, Columbus Circle gave the game a Japan-only limited release on a physical Super Famicom cartridge. It was released on June 30, 2017 where it retailed for 6,998 yen and was distributed via Amazon.

References

External links 
 Hardcore Gaming 101: Schbibinman

1997 video games
Masaya Games games
Super Nintendo Entertainment System games
Super Nintendo Entertainment System-only games
Satellaview games
Japan-exclusive video games
Video games developed in Japan
Multiplayer and single-player video games